TRICS (Trip Rate Information Computer System) is a database of trip rates for developments used in the United Kingdom for transport planning purposes, specifically to quantify the trip generation of new developments.

The TRICS Consortium describes TRICS as follows:

Release history

The database was established in 1989 by six county councils in South East England county councils (Dorset, East Sussex, Hampshire, Kent, Surrey and West Sussex). It is now maintained by TRICS Consortium Ltd, based in Barnet, London.

TRICS 7, a major update, was released in late 2013.

Developments

TRICS includes the following development categories:
Retail
Employment
Residential
Education
Health
Hotel, Food and Drink
Leisure
Marinas
Golf
Tourist Attractions
Civic Amenity Sites
Petrol Stations
Car Showrooms

SAM for Travel Plans
TRICS have also developed SAM (Standard Assessment Methodology), a system to measure the effectiveness of travel plans.

References

External links
Official site
Example TRICS Output - application to Ribble Valley District Council

Transportation planning
Databases in the United Kingdom